Holger Hott, formerly Holger Hott Johansen, (born 8 April 1974) is a Norwegian orienteering competitor who has won two individual long-distance bronze medals in the World Championships in 2004 and 2005. He was part of Norway's relay team that took gold in the World Championships in Japan in 2005. He also won the overall world cup in 2004.

In August 2006 he won his first individual World Championship title when he took gold in the middle distance at the World Championships in Århus, Denmark.

He competes for Kristiansand Orienteering Club, and was formerly with IF Trauma, IL Express, IL Imås, IFK Lidingö, Bækkelaget Sportsklubb.

He is also a civil engineer (sound/acoustics).

He is married to the Canadian orienteerer Sandy Hott (née Smith). In the spring of 2007 they decided to change their surnames from Hott Johansen merely to Hott, to make it simple and easy to spell. They had thought of this name change for a while, and finally decided to do it before their first son was born in June 2007.

Titles
 World Championship gold – middle distance, 2006
 World Championship gold – relay, 2005
 World Championship bronze – long distance, 2004 and 2005
 World Cup – relay 2004
 Nordic Masters silver – middle distance 2003 and 2005
 Nordic Masters bronze – middle distance 2001, bronze long distance 2005
 National Championships individual – 4 gold, 3 silver, 1 bronze
 National Championships relay – 4 gold, 1 silver, 2 bronze

References

External links
 
 
 

1974 births
Living people
Sportspeople from Kristiansand
Norwegian orienteers
Male orienteers
Foot orienteers
World Orienteering Championships medalists
21st-century Norwegian people
Competitors at the 2005 World Games
Junior World Orienteering Championships medalists